The Southern constituency (No.218) is a Russian legislative constituency in Saint Petersburg. Until 2007 Southern constituency was based in eastern Saint Petersburg, covering Frunzensky and Nesvky districts. However, in 2016 Saint Petersburg constituencies were drastically redrawn with territory of the former Southern constituency being split between Eastern and South East constituencies. New Southern constituency was made from parts of now obsolete Admiralteysky and South West constituencies.

Members elected

Election results

1993

|-
! colspan=2 style="background-color:#E9E9E9;text-align:left;vertical-align:top;" |Candidate
! style="background-color:#E9E9E9;text-align:left;vertical-align:top;" |Party
! style="background-color:#E9E9E9;text-align:right;" |Votes
! style="background-color:#E9E9E9;text-align:right;" |%
|-
|style="background-color:"|
|align=left|Aleksandr Yegorov
|align=left|Independent
|
|16.06%
|-
|style="background-color:"|
|align=left|Yelena Drapeko
|align=left|Independent
| -
|14.71%
|-
| colspan="5" style="background-color:#E9E9E9;"|
|- style="font-weight:bold"
| colspan="3" style="text-align:left;" | Total
| 
| 100%
|-
| colspan="5" style="background-color:#E9E9E9;"|
|- style="font-weight:bold"
| colspan="4" |Source:
|
|}

1995

|-
! colspan=2 style="background-color:#E9E9E9;text-align:left;vertical-align:top;" |Candidate
! style="background-color:#E9E9E9;text-align:left;vertical-align:top;" |Party
! style="background-color:#E9E9E9;text-align:right;" |Votes
! style="background-color:#E9E9E9;text-align:right;" |%
|-
|style="background-color:"|
|align=left|Aleksandr Mazur
|align=left|Yabloko
|
|22.35%
|-
|style="background-color:"|
|align=left|Vladimir Tokarev
|align=left|Communist Party
|
|10.86%
|-
|style="background-color:"|
|align=left|Sergey Popov
|align=left|Independent
|
|8.07%
|-
|style="background-color:#FF4400"|
|align=left|Oleg Sergeyev
|align=left|Party of Workers' Self-Government
|
|6.27%
|-
|style="background-color:#DA2021"|
|align=left|Aleksandr Yegorov (incumbent)
|align=left|Ivan Rybkin Bloc
|
|5.61%
|-
|style="background-color:"|
|align=left|Aleksey Borets
|align=left|Independent
|
|4.29%
|-
|style="background-color:#FE4801"|
|align=left|Nikolay Kupriyanov
|align=left|Pamfilova–Gurov–Lysenko
|
|3.19%
|-
|style="background-color:#2C299A"|
|align=left|Aleksey Musakov
|align=left|Congress of Russian Communities
|
|2.89%
|-
|style="background-color:"|
|align=left|Vladislav Karabanov
|align=left|Independent
|
|2.81%
|-
|style="background-color:"|
|align=left|Viktor Zavadsky
|align=left|Independent
|
|2.60%
|-
|style="background-color:#D50000"|
|align=left|Nikolay Shchepiorko
|align=left|Communists and Working Russia - for the Soviet Union
|
|2.53%
|-
|style="background-color:"|
|align=left|Ivan Sadchikov
|align=left|Liberal Democratic Party
|
|2.20%
|-
|style="background-color:#F21A29"|
|align=left|Anatoly Mukhin
|align=left|Trade Unions and Industrialists – Union of Labour
|
|2.14%
|-
|style="background-color:"|
|align=left|Pavel Nazarov
|align=left|Independent
|
|2.13%
|-
|style="background-color:"|
|align=left|Nikolay Tikhonov
|align=left|Independent
|
|2.02%
|-
|style="background-color:#00A200"|
|align=left|Tatyana Vinogradova
|align=left|Transformation of the Fatherland
|
|1.56%
|-
|style="background-color:#5A5A58"|
|align=left|Mikhail Novikov
|align=left|Federal Democratic Movement
|
|1.54%
|-
|style="background-color:"|
|align=left|Vladimir Bogomolov
|align=left|Independent
|
|1.50%
|-
|style="background-color:"|
|align=left|Yevgeny Ivanov
|align=left|Education — Future of Russia
|
|1.17%
|-
|style="background-color:"|
|align=left|Pavel Kutenkov
|align=left|Independent
|
|0.96%
|-
|style="background-color:"|
|align=left|Ivan Kravchenko
|align=left|Independent
|
|0.91%
|-
|style="background-color:"|
|align=left|Yury Romanov
|align=left|Russian Party of Automobile Owners
|
|0.73%
|-
|style="background-color:#3C3E42"|
|align=left|Oleg Razygrin
|align=left|Duma-96
|
|0.14%
|-
|style="background-color:#000000"|
|colspan=2 |against all
|
|9.79%
|-
| colspan="5" style="background-color:#E9E9E9;"|
|- style="font-weight:bold"
| colspan="3" style="text-align:left;" | Total
| 
| 100%
|-
| colspan="5" style="background-color:#E9E9E9;"|
|- style="font-weight:bold"
| colspan="4" |Source:
|
|}

1999

|-
! colspan=2 style="background-color:#E9E9E9;text-align:left;vertical-align:top;" |Candidate
! style="background-color:#E9E9E9;text-align:left;vertical-align:top;" |Party
! style="background-color:#E9E9E9;text-align:right;" |Votes
! style="background-color:#E9E9E9;text-align:right;" |%
|-
|style="background-color:#3B9EDF"|
|align=left|Oksana Dmitriyeva
|align=left|Fatherland – All Russia
|
|40.67%
|-
|style="background-color:"|
|align=left|German Azersky
|align=left|Yabloko
|
|11.56%
|-
|style="background-color:"|
|align=left|Vladimir Tokarev
|align=left|Communist Party
|
|11.40%
|-
|style="background-color:#FCCA19"|
|align=left|Aleksandr Yegorov
|align=left|Congress of Russian Communities-Yury Boldyrev Movement
|
|5.20%
|-
|style="background-color:#C21022"|
|align=left|Valentin Korovin
|align=left|Party of Pensioners
|
|3.47%
|-
|style="background-color:"|
|align=left|Sergey Ovsyannikov
|align=left|Liberal Democratic Party
|
|2.90%
|-
|style="background-color:#D50000"|
|align=left|Tamara Vedernikova
|align=left|Communists and Workers of Russia - for the Soviet Union
|
|2.69%
|-
|style="background-color:#020266"|
|align=left|Georgy Fedorov
|align=left|Russian Socialist Party
|
|1.95%
|-
|style="background-color:"|
|align=left|Aleksandr Bespalov
|align=left|Our Home – Russia
|
|1.77%
|-
|style="background-color:"|
|align=left|Aleksandr Yevseyev
|align=left|Independent
|
|1.46%
|-
|style="background-color:"|
|align=left|Vladimir Bogomolov
|align=left|Independent
|
|1.25%
|-
|style="background-color:"|
|align=left|Pavel Kutenkov
|align=left|Independent
|
|1.11%
|-
|style="background-color:#084284"|
|align=left|Vladislav Karabanov
|align=left|Spiritual Heritage
|
|0.90%
|-
|style="background-color:#000000"|
|colspan=2 |against all
|
|12.63%
|-
| colspan="5" style="background-color:#E9E9E9;"|
|- style="font-weight:bold"
| colspan="3" style="text-align:left;" | Total
| 
| 100%
|-
| colspan="5" style="background-color:#E9E9E9;"|
|- style="font-weight:bold"
| colspan="4" |Source:
|
|}

2003

|-
! colspan=2 style="background-color:#E9E9E9;text-align:left;vertical-align:top;" |Candidate
! style="background-color:#E9E9E9;text-align:left;vertical-align:top;" |Party
! style="background-color:#E9E9E9;text-align:right;" |Votes
! style="background-color:#E9E9E9;text-align:right;" |%
|-
|style="background-color:#14589F"|
|align=left|Oksana Dmitriyeva (incumbent)
|align=left|Development of Enterprise
|
|53.99%
|-
|style="background-color:"|
|align=left|Oleg Sergeyev
|align=left|United Russia
|
|14.36%
|-
|style="background-color:"|
|align=left|Natalia Yevdokimova
|align=left|Yabloko
|
|8.62%
|-
|style="background-color:#00A1FF"|
|align=left|Yevgeny Kosterev
|align=left|Party of Russia's Rebirth-Russian Party of Life
|
|5.10%
|-
|style="background-color:"|
|align=left|Andrey Yerofeyev
|align=left|Liberal Democratic Party
|
|3.41%
|-
|style="background-color:#164C8C"|
|align=left|Andrey Anokhin
|align=left|United Russian Party Rus'
|
|2.75%
|-
|style="background-color:#000000"|
|colspan=2 |against all
|
|10.51%
|-
| colspan="5" style="background-color:#E9E9E9;"|
|- style="font-weight:bold"
| colspan="3" style="text-align:left;" | Total
| 
| 100%
|-
| colspan="5" style="background-color:#E9E9E9;"|
|- style="font-weight:bold"
| colspan="4" |Source:
|
|}

2016

|-
! colspan=2 style="background-color:#E9E9E9;text-align:left;vertical-align:top;" |Candidate
! style="background-color:#E9E9E9;text-align:leftt;vertical-align:top;" |Party
! style="background-color:#E9E9E9;text-align:right;" |Votes
! style="background-color:#E9E9E9;text-align:right;" |%
|-
|style="background-color: " |
|align=left|Vitaly Milonov
|align=left|United Russia
|
|34.24%
|-
|style="background-color:"|
|align=left|Aleksey Kovalyov
|align=left|A Just Russia
|
|13.95%
|-
|style="background:"| 
|align=left|Dmitry Pavlov
|align=left|Party of Growth
|
|10.07%
|-
|style="background:"| 
|align=left|Olga Tsepilova
|align=left|Yabloko
|
|10.00%
|-
|style="background-color:"|
|align=left|Ilya Rubtsov
|align=left|Liberal Democratic Party
|
|7.60%
|-
|style="background-color:"|
|align=left|German Sadulayev
|align=left|Communist Party
|
|7.37%
|-
|style="background:"| 
|align=left|Yury Perevyazkin
|align=left|Communists of Russia
|
|3.64%
|-
|style="background-color:"|
|align=left|Anna Filonenko
|align=left|Rodina
|
|3.31%
|-
|style="background:"| 
|align=left|Lev Dmitriyev
|align=left|People's Freedom Party
|
|2.73%
|-
|style="background:"| 
|align=left|Aleksey Grave
|align=left|Patriots of Russia
|
|1.89%
|-
|style="background:"| 
|align=left|Ruslan Tikhomirov
|align=left|Civic Platform
|
|1.39%
|-
| colspan="5" style="background-color:#E9E9E9;"|
|- style="font-weight:bold"
| colspan="3" style="text-align:left;" | Total
| 
| 100%
|-
| colspan="5" style="background-color:#E9E9E9;"|
|- style="font-weight:bold"
| colspan="4" |Source:
|
|}

2021

|-
! colspan=2 style="background-color:#E9E9E9;text-align:left;vertical-align:top;" |Candidate
! style="background-color:#E9E9E9;text-align:left;vertical-align:top;" |Party
! style="background-color:#E9E9E9;text-align:right;" |Votes
! style="background-color:#E9E9E9;text-align:right;" |%
|-
|style="background-color: " |
|align=left|Vitaly Milonov (incumbent)
|align=left|United Russia
|
|26.66%
|-
|style="background-color:"|
|align=left|Boris Oreshkov
|align=left|Yabloko
|
|16.72%
|-
|style="background-color:"|
|align=left|Valery Duleba
|align=left|Communist Party
|
|15.15%
|-
|style="background-color: "|
|align=left|Yekaterina Mashkova
|align=left|New People
|
|9.95%
|-
|style="background-color:"|
|align=left|Ilya Shmakov
|align=left|A Just Russia — For Truth
|
|8.36%
|-
|style="background-color: "|
|align=left|Sergey Lisovsky
|align=left|Party of Pensioners
|
|5.18%
|-
|style="background-color:"|
|align=left|Yury Lomakin
|align=left|Liberal Democratic Party
|
|4.07%
|-
|style="background-color:"|
|align=left|Andrey Krutov
|align=left|Party of Growth
|
|3.07%
|-
|style="background-color:"|
|align=left|Alik Burlakov
|align=left|The Greens
|
|3.07%
|-
|style="background-color:"|
|align=left|Sergey Krupko
|align=left|Rodina
|
|1.91%
|-
|style="background-color:"|
|align=left|Maksim Tsymbalyuk
|align=left|Green Alternative
|
|0.79%
|-
|style="background:"| 
|align=left|Aleksandr Smirnov
|align=left|Civic Platform
|
|0.76%
|-
| colspan="5" style="background-color:#E9E9E9;"|
|- style="font-weight:bold"
| colspan="3" style="text-align:left;" | Total
| 
| 100%
|-
| colspan="5" style="background-color:#E9E9E9;"|
|- style="font-weight:bold"
| colspan="4" |Source:
|
|}

Notes

References

Russian legislative constituencies
Politics of Saint Petersburg